Pissaladière (or) is a dish of flatbread with toppings in the cuisines of Liguria (especially Genoa) and Nice. It is often compared to pizza. The dough is usually a bread dough thicker than that of the classic pizza Margherita, and the traditional topping usually consists of caramelised (almost pureed) onions, black olives, and anchovies (whole, and sometimes also with pissalat, a type of anchovy paste). This dish subsequently spread to the whole of geographic and ethno-cultural Liguria, that is to say between the rivers of Magra and Var. After the annexation of the County of Nice to France, this dish of Ligurian origin became established in French cuisine.

Etymology
The etymology of the word seems to originate from the Latin piscis "fish", which in turn originated pissalat, the name of an anchovy paste (via peis salat, "salted fish" in older Ligurian and Niçard).

Description
The dough is usually a bread dough thicker than that of the classic pizza margherita, and the traditional topping usually consists of caramelised (almost pureed) onions, black olives, and anchovies (whole, and sometimes also with pissalat).

See also
 Cuisine of Liguria
 List of Italian dishes

References

External links
Recipe courtesy Emeril Lagasse, 2002
Delia Smiths's recipe, with UK & metric measures
Flo Braker's variant, with cheese

Pizza varieties
Cuisine of Provence
Cuisine of Liguria
French cuisine
Monegasque cuisine
Appetizers
Onion-based foods
Anchovy dishes